This table shows an overview of the protected heritage sites in the Walloon town Braine-le-Château. This list is part of Belgium's national heritage.

|}

See also 
 Lists of protected heritage sites in Walloon Brabant
Braine-le-Château

References
 Belgian heritage register: Direction générale opérationnelle - Aménagement du territoire, Logement, Patrimoine et Energie (DG4)
 www.dglive.be

Braine-le-Chateau
Braine-le-Château